This is a list of 182 species in Leucochrysa, a genus of green lacewings in the family Chrysopidae.

Leucochrysa species

 Leucochrysa adamsi Penny, 2001 i c g
 Leucochrysa affinis de Freitas & Penny, 2001 c g
 Leucochrysa aleura (Banks, 1944) i c g
 Leucochrysa alloneura (Banks, 1946) i c g
 Leucochrysa alternata Navás, 1913 i c g
 Leucochrysa amazonica Navás, 1913 i c g
 Leucochrysa americana Banks, 1897 i c g
 Leucochrysa amistadensis Penny, 2001 i c g
 Leucochrysa anae de Freitas, 2007 c g
 Leucochrysa anchietai (Navás, 1922) i c g
 Leucochrysa angrandi (Navás, 1911) c g
 Leucochrysa antennalis (Navás, 1932) i c g
 Leucochrysa antica Navás, 1913 i c g
 Leucochrysa apicalis Banks, 1915 i c g
 Leucochrysa apicata (Navás, 1926) i c g
 Leucochrysa arizonica (Banks, 1906) i c g
 Leucochrysa askanes (Banks, 1946) i c g
 Leucochrysa azevedoi Navás, 1913 i c g
 Leucochrysa barrei Freitas and Penny, 2001 i c g
 Leucochrysa bedoci Navás, 1924 i c g
 Leucochrysa benoisti Navás, 1933 i c g
 Leucochrysa benoistina Navás, 1934 i c g
 Leucochrysa bolivari Banks, 1944 c g
 Leucochrysa boliviana (Banks, 1915) i c g
 Leucochrysa boxi Navás, 1930 i c g
 Leucochrysa brasilica (Navás, 1913) i c g
 Leucochrysa bruneola de Freitas & Penny, 2001 c g
 Leucochrysa callota Banks, 1915 i c g
 Leucochrysa camposi (Navás, 1913) i c g
 Leucochrysa catarinae de Freitas & Penny, 2001 c g
 Leucochrysa caucella Banks, 1910 i c g
 Leucochrysa centralis Navás, 1913 i c g
 Leucochrysa cerverai (Navás, 1922) i c g
 Leucochrysa championi Navás, 1914 i c g
 Leucochrysa christophei Banks, 1938 i c g
 Leucochrysa cidae de Freitas, 2007 c g
 Leucochrysa clara (McLachlan, 1867) i c g
 Leucochrysa clepsydra Banks, 1918 i c g
 Leucochrysa clystera Banks, 1918 i c g
 Leucochrysa colombia (Banks, 1910) i c g
 Leucochrysa compar (Navás, 1921) i c g
 Leucochrysa confusa Freitas and Penny, 2001 i c g
 Leucochrysa cornesta (Banks, 1944) i c g
 Leucochrysa cornuta Freitas and Penny, 2001 i c g
 Leucochrysa cortesi Navás, 1913 i c g
 Leucochrysa cruentata (Schneider, 1851) i c g
 Leucochrysa deminuta LaCroix, 1926 i c g
 Leucochrysa diasi (Navás, 1922) i c g
 Leucochrysa digitiformis C. Tauber and Albuquerque in C. Tauber et al., 2008 i c g
 Leucochrysa dimidia (Navás, 1925) i c g
 Leucochrysa diversa (Walker, 1853) i c g
 Leucochrysa dolichocera (Navás, 1913) i c g
 Leucochrysa duarte Banks, 1946 i c g
 Leucochrysa egregia Navás, 1913 i c g
 Leucochrysa ehrhardti Navás, 1929 i c g
 Leucochrysa erminea Banks, 1946 i
 Leucochrysa eubule (Banks, 1944) i c g
 Leucochrysa euterpe (Banks, 1944) i c g
 Leucochrysa explorata (Hagen, 1861) i c g
 Leucochrysa firmini (Navás, 1924) i c g
 Leucochrysa floridana Banks, 1897 i c g
 Leucochrysa forciformis Freitas and Penny, 2001 i c g
 Leucochrysa forcipata Penny, 1998 i c g
 Leucochrysa furcata Freitas and Penny, 2001 i c g
 Leucochrysa fuscinervis Navás, 1914 i c g
 Leucochrysa garridoi (Alayo, 1968) i c g
 Leucochrysa gemina (Navás, 1929) i c g
 Leucochrysa geminata Navás, 1913 i c g
 Leucochrysa gloriosa (Banks, 1910) i c g
 Leucochrysa gossei (Kimmins, 1940) i c g
 Leucochrysa grisoli (Navás, 1912) i c g
 Leucochrysa guataparensis Freitas and Penny, 2001 i c g
 Leucochrysa heriocles (Banks, 1944) i c g
 Leucochrysa horni (Navás, 1932) i c g
 Leucochrysa hybrida (Rambur, 1842) i c g
 Leucochrysa icterica Freitas and Penny, 2001 i c g
 Leucochrysa ignatii Navás, 1923 i c g
 Leucochrysa incognita Freitas and Penny, 2001 i c g
 Leucochrysa indiga (Navás, 1928) i c g
 Leucochrysa inquinata Gerstaecker, 1888 i c g
 Leucochrysa insularis (Walker, 1853) i c g b
 Leucochrysa interata Freitas and Penny, 2001 i c g
 Leucochrysa intermedia (Schneider, 1851) i c g
 Leucochrysa israeli (Alayo, 1968) i c g
 Leucochrysa kotzbaueri (Navás, 1926) i c g
 Leucochrysa laertes (Banks, 1946) i c g
 Leucochrysa lafoni (Navás, 1911) i c g
 Leucochrysa lancala (Banks, 1944) i c g
 Leucochrysa lateralis Navás, 1913 i c g
 Leucochrysa lenora Banks, 1944 i c g
 Leucochrysa lestagei Navás, 1922 i c g
 Leucochrysa lineata Freitas and Penny, 2001 i c g
 Leucochrysa longicornis (Gray in Cuvier, 1832) i c g
 Leucochrysa longistigma (Navás, 1930) i c g
 Leucochrysa loretana Navás, 1935 i c g
 Leucochrysa maculosa Freitas and Penny, 2001 i c g
 Leucochrysa magnifica (Banks, 1920) i c g
 Leucochrysa mainerina (Navás, 1929) i c g
 Leucochrysa marginalis Banks, 1915 i c g
 Leucochrysa maronica Navás, 1915 i c g
 Leucochrysa marquezi Navás, 1913 i c g
 Leucochrysa melanocera Navás, 1916 i c g
 Leucochrysa meridana (Navás, 1927) i c g
 Leucochrysa meteorica Gerstaecker, 1894 i c g
 Leucochrysa mexicana Banks, 1900 i c g
 Leucochrysa michelini Freitas and Penny, 2001 i c g
 Leucochrysa minima Banks, 1918 i c g
 Leucochrysa montanola Banks, 1910 i c g
 Leucochrysa morenoi (Navás, 1934) i c g
 Leucochrysa morrisoni (Navás, 1914) i c g
 Leucochrysa mortoni LaCroix, 1926 i c g
 Leucochrysa nativa (Navás, 1911) i c g
 Leucochrysa navasi (Kimmins, 1940) i c g
 Leucochrysa negata (Navás, 1913) i c g
 Leucochrysa nesites Navás, 1913 i c g
 Leucochrysa neuralis Banks, 1910 i c g
 Leucochrysa nictheroyana (Navás, 1926) i c g
 Leucochrysa nigrilabris (Banks, 1915) i c g
 Leucochrysa nigrovaria (Walker, 1853) i c g
 Leucochrysa notha Navás, 1913 i c g
 Leucochrysa notulata (Navás, 1924) i c g
 Leucochrysa ocampina (Banks, 1941) i c g
 Leucochrysa orthones (Banks, 1946) i c g
 Leucochrysa pacifica (Navás, 1929) i c g
 Leucochrysa pallescens (Banks, 1946) i c g
 Leucochrysa panamana (Banks, 1944) i c g
 Leucochrysa parallela Freitas and Penny, 2001 i c g
 Leucochrysa paraquaria (Navás, 1929) i c g
 Leucochrysa pavida (Hagen, 1861) i c g b
 Leucochrysa phaeocephala Navás, 1929 c g
 Leucochrysa platyptera Gerstaecker, 1888 i c g
 Leucochrysa postica Navás, 1913 i c g
 Leucochrysa pretiosa (Banks, 1910) i c g
 Leucochrysa prisca Engel & Grimaldi, 2007 c g
 Leucochrysa punctata Banks, 1903 i c g
 Leucochrysa radiosa Gerstaecker, 1888 i c g
 Leucochrysa ramosa (Navás, 1917) i c g
 Leucochrysa ramosi (Navás, 1916) i c g
 Leucochrysa ratcliffei Penny, 2001 i c g
 Leucochrysa reedi Navás, 1919 i c g
 Leucochrysa retusa Freitas and Penny, 2001 i c g
 Leucochrysa risi Esben-Petersen, 1933 i
 Leucochrysa riveti (Navás, 1913) i c g
 Leucochrysa robusta Freitas and Penny, 2001 i c g
 Leucochrysa rochana (Navás, 1922) i c g
 Leucochrysa rodriguezi Navás, 1913 i c g
 Leucochrysa rufescens (Navás, 1931) i c g
 Leucochrysa salleana (Navás, 1911) i c g
 Leucochrysa santini Freitas and Penny, 2001 i c g
 Leucochrysa scomparini Freitas and Penny, 2001 i c g
 Leucochrysa scurra LaCroix, 1926 i c g
 Leucochrysa senior (Navás, 1935) i c g
 Leucochrysa serrei (Navás, 1924) i c g
 Leucochrysa serrula Adams, 1979 c g
 Leucochrysa squamisetosa Freitas and Penny, 2001 i c g
 Leucochrysa stichocera Navás, 1908 i c g
 Leucochrysa submacula Banks, 1915 i c g
 Leucochrysa sulcata (Navás, 1921) i c g
 Leucochrysa superior Navás, 1913 i c g
 Leucochrysa surinamensis (Banks, 1944) i c g
 Leucochrysa tabacina Freitas and Penny, 2001 i c g
 Leucochrysa tarini (Navás, 1924) i c g
 Leucochrysa tavaresi Navás, 1916 i c g
 Leucochrysa tenuis Freitas and Penny, 2001 i c g
 Leucochrysa theodori (Navás, 1932) i c g
 Leucochrysa theodorina (Navás, 1935) i c g
 Leucochrysa urucumis de Freitas, 2007 c g
 Leucochrysa varia (Schneider, 1851) i c g
 Leucochrysa variata (Navás, 1913) c g
 Leucochrysa vegana (Navás, 1925) c
 Leucochrysa vieirana Navás, 1913 c g
 Leucochrysa vieriana Navás, 1913 i g
 Leucochrysa vignisi Freitas and Penny, 2001 i c g
 Leucochrysa vigoi Navás, 1913 i c g
 Leucochrysa vinesi (Navás, 1924) i c g
 Leucochrysa virginiae Penny, 1998 i c g
 Leucochrysa vittata Freitas and Penny, 2001 i c g
 Leucochrysa vulnerata (Navás, 1914) i c g
 Leucochrysa walkerina Navás, 1913 i
 Leucochrysa ypirangana (Navás, 1932) i c g
 Leucochrysa zapotina Navás, 1913 i c g
 Leucochrysa zayasi (Alayo, 1968) i c g

Data sources: i = ITIS, c = Catalogue of Life, g = GBIF, b = Bugguide.net

References

Leucochrysa
Articles created by Qbugbot